These Things Take Time is a live performance album by SubArachnoid Space, released on September 19, 2000 by Release Entertainment.

Track listing

Personnel 
Adapted from the These Things Take Time liner notes.

SubArachnoid Space
 Chris Van Huffel – drums, percussion
 Melynda Jackson – guitar
 Mason Jones – guitar, theremin
 Andey Koa Stephens – bass guitar, organ

Production and additional personnel
 Grawer – engineering
 Jai-Young Kim – mastering
 Loren Rhoads – photography

Release history

References

External links 
 These Things Take Time at Bandcamp
 These Things Take Time at Discogs (list of releases)

2000 live albums
SubArachnoid Space albums
Relapse Records live albums